Nancy Jepkosgei Kiprop (born 7 July 1979) is a Kenyan long-distance runner. She won the Vienna City Marathon in 2017, 2018 and in 2019. In 2019 she also set a new course record of 2:22:12.

Career 

In 2005, she won the Almond Blossom Cross Country, a distance of 8,000 metres, with a time of 19:35.

In 2008, she won the Parelloop held in Brunssum, Netherlands with a time of 32:43.

In 2014, she won the women's 10 kilometres event at the Lidingöloppet with a time of 34:24.

In 2016, she won the Granollers Half Marathon with a time of 1:11:30.

In 2018, she finished in 2nd place in the Ústí nad Labem Half Marathon with a time of 1:07:32.

In the 2019 New York City Marathon she finished in 4th place.

Achievements

Notes

References

External links 
 

Living people
1979 births
Place of birth missing (living people)
Kenyan female marathon runners
Kenyan female long-distance runners